Hugh Munro (March 22, 1854 – 1939) was an Ontario blacksmith and political figure. He represented Glengarry in the Legislative Assembly of Ontario as a Liberal member from 1911 to 1919.

He was born in Charlottenburg Township, Canada West, the son of Donald Munro. In 1883, Munro married Emma McCracken. With a partner, he manufactured carriages at a plant Alexandria. At one time, the plant employed as many as 300 people, but was put out of business by the introduction of automobiles. Munro also served as reeve and mayor for Alexandria. He died in Edmonton, Alberta.

External links 

Stormont, Dundas and Glengarry : a history, 1784-1945, JG Harkness (1946)

1854 births
1939 deaths
Mayors of places in Ontario
Ontario Liberal Party MPPs
People from the United Counties of Stormont, Dundas and Glengarry